Ocean Way Recording was a series of recording studios established by recording engineer and producer Allen Sides with locations in Los Angeles, California, Nashville, Tennessee, and Saint Barthélemy. Ocean Way Recording no longer operates recording facilities, but Ocean Way Nashville continues to operate under the ownership of Belmont University.

History

Background
In 1972, Ocean Way founder Allen Sides opened a studio he had built in a 3 1/2-car garage on Ocean Way in Santa Monica, California for the purpose of demonstrating tai-amplified loudspeakers of his own design. In 1977, Sides, who had worked as a runner at United Western Recorders in the late 1960s, purchased enough equipment from Putnam's company UREI to completely fill the garage space for just $6,000, attracting the attention of Putnam. Sides and Putnam became friends and business partners, and Putnam offered Sides exclusive rights to sell UREI and United Western Studios' surplus equipment, providing Sides and his studio with a wide variety of studio equipment.

Ocean Way Hollywood

In 1976, after the lease on Sides' garage studio was abruptly canceled, Putnam provided space at United Western Recorders, leasing United Studio B to Sides. Six years later, Sides lease at United Western expanded to include United Studio A. When Putnam sold his companies to Harman in 1984, Harman sold the Western building and its contents to Sides, who later also acquired the United building. 

Sides renamed the United Western Studios complex Ocean Way Recording after the location of his former garage studio. Ocean Way Studios operated the two-building complex from 1985 until 1999, when the former Western Studios building at 6000 Sunset Boulevard was partitioned, sold, and renamed Cello Studios. In 2006, the studio again changed ownership, and has since been in operation as EastWest Studios.

Ocean Way Studios continued operations in the building at 6050 Sunset Boulevard until 2013, when it was sold to Hudson Pacific Properties. Since 2015 it has been known as United Recording Studios.

Ocean Way Nashville
In 1995, Sides and Gary Belz purchased the 1911 Church of the Advent, a 100-year old Brownstone church building in Nashville's Music Row district, converting it to open Ocean Way Nashville the following year. In 2001, Sides and Belz sold the studios to Belmont University for use by the Mike Curb College of Entertainment & Music Business (CEMB). The university continues to operate the commercial studios, while also utilizing them as hands-on classrooms to teach audio engineering. Belmont University maintains license of the Ocean Way name and Sides remains a consultant.

Other Ocean Way studios
The Ocean Way Studios Group also included Record One studios in Sherman Oaks, California, which was acquired by Sides in 1988, and another Ocean Way Studio location in Saint Barthélemy.

Ocean Way Recording no longer operates recording facilities.

Other Ocean Way companies
Sides is also the founder of Ocean Way Audio, a manufacturer of speaker systems. Ocean Way Drums, a partnership between Sides and producer Steven Miller, produces virtual instrument software.

References

External links
 Ocean Way Recording - About

See also
 United Western Recorders
 EastWest Studios
 

Recording studios in California
Audio engineering
Buildings and structures in Hollywood, Los Angeles
Sunset Boulevard (Los Angeles)
Music of Los Angeles
Companies based in Los Angeles
Entertainment companies based in California
Entertainment companies established in 1984
Mass media companies established in 1984
Mass media companies disestablished in 2015
1984 establishments in California
2015 disestablishments in California